Blastobotrys is a genus of fungi belonging to the family Trichomonascaceae.

The genus has cosmopolitan distribution.

Species

Species:
 Blastobotrys adeninivorans 
 Blastobotrys americanus 
 Blastobotrys arbuscula

References

Fungi